Fishmarket, also spelt Fish Market, is a street in Luxembourg City, in southern Luxembourg, that shares its name with the neighbourhood directly surrounding it.  It lies in the eastern part of the Ville Haute quarter.

Fishmarket was historically the centre of the city.  Built at the junction of two Roman roads,  it was the site chosen as the heart of Luxembourg Castle.  The name is derived from its use as a marketplace for the sale of fish, along with markets for various agricultural produce (such as cheese), the trade of which was the foundation for Luxembourg's early economy.

Fishmarket is the home of several buildings and institutions of national importance:
 Council of State
 National Museum of History and Art
 Saint Michael's Church

Streets in Luxembourg City
Neighbourhoods of Luxembourg City
Council of State of Luxembourg